Aventura is a planned, suburban city in northeastern Miami-Dade County, Florida, United States,  north of Miami and part of the Miami metropolitan area. The city is especially known for Aventura Mall, the third largest mall in the United States by total square feet of retail space and the largest mall in Florida.

The city name is from the Spanish word for "adventure", and was named "Aventura" after the developers of the original group of condominiums in the area, Eddie Lewis and Don Soffer, who had remarked "What an adventure this is going to be."

As of the 2020 census, the city population was 40,242, up from 35,762 in 2010.

History
Initially referred to as "Turnberry", Aventura began to be developed during the early 1970s and became an incorporated city in 1995. The Aventura Police Department was formed in 1997.

The city is home to the luxury resort Turnberry Isle, where the yacht Monkey Business was docked during the Gary Hart/Donna Rice incident, which contributed to Hart's ending his 1988 bid for the presidency.

Aventura is also home to the Aventura Mall, the third-largest shopping mall in the US. Built in 1983, it is a joint venture of Turnberry Associates and Simon Property, and brings a major source of income to the city.

In early 2001, former US President Bill Clinton delivered one of his first speeches after leaving the White House at Aventura-Turnberry Jewish Center.

Geography and climate

Geography
It is bordered to the east by Golden Beach and Sunny Isles Beach, to the south by North Miami Beach, and to the west by unincorporated Ojus. It is bordered to the north by Hallandale Beach in Broward County. U.S. Route 1 (Biscayne Boulevard) runs along the western edge of the city, leading south  to Downtown Miami and north  to Fort Lauderdale.

Of that,  are land and  (24.73%) are water. The Atlantic Intracoastal Waterway and Dumfoundling Bay form the eastern border of the city, while the southern border is within Maule Lake.

Surrounding areas
  Hallandale Beach
  Hallandale Beach    Hallandale Beach
  Ojus   Golden Beach, Sunny Isles Beach
 North Miami Beach    Sunny Isles Beach
  North Miami Beach

Climate
Aventura has a tropical monsoon climate (Köppen climate classification Am) with hot and humid summers and short, warm winters, with a marked drier season in the winter. The city sees most of its rain in the summer (wet season) and is mainly dry in winter (dry season). The wet season, which is hot and humid, lasts from May to September, when it gives way to the dry season, which features mild temperatures with some invasions of colder air, which is when the little winter rainfall occurs-with the passing of a front. The hurricane season largely coincides with the wet season.

In addition to its sea-level elevation, coastal location and position just north of the Tropic of Cancer, the area owes its warm, humid climate to the Gulf Stream, which moderates climate year-round. A typical summer day does not see temperatures below . Temperatures in the high 80s to low 90s (30–35 °C) accompanied by high humidity are often relieved by afternoon thunderstorms or a sea breeze that develops off the Atlantic Ocean, which then allow lower temperatures, although conditions still remain very muggy. During winter, humidity is significantly lower, allowing for cooler weather to develop.

Hurricane season begins June 1 and is officially over November 30. Aventura was severely hit by Hurricane Wilma on October 24, 2005 and was still undergoing recovery as of November 2011. The library was destroyed and has been rebuilt. Terraces flew off of high-rises and condos on high floors were flooded with many of their walls exploding into next-door apartments and adjacent hallways. Countless high-rise windows exploded and electricity stopped.

Demographics

2020 census

As of the 2020 United States census, there were 40,242 people, 18,035 households, and 9,370 families residing in the city.

2010 census

In 2010, there were 26,120 households, out of which 31.5% were vacant. As of 2000, 11.3% had children under the age of 18 living with them, 39.6% were married couples living together, 6.2% had a female householder with no husband present, and 52.2% were non-families. 45.3% of all households were made up of individuals, and 23.2% had someone living alone who was 65 years of age or older. The average household size was 1.79 and the average family size was 2.45.

2000 census
In 2000, the city population was spread out, with 10.1% under the age of 18, 4.6% from 18 to 24, 26.5% from 25 to 44, 23.6% from 45 to 64, and 35.2% who were 65 years of age or older. The median age was 53 years. For every 100 females, there were 80.2 males. For every 100 females age 18 and over, there were 77.9 males.

As of 2000, the median income for a household in the city was $44,526, and the median income for a family was $59,507. Males had a median income of $50,791 versus $37,682 for females. The per capita income for the city was $41,092. About 5.6% of families and 9.1% of the population were below the poverty line, including 8.5% of those under age 18 and 8.5% of those age 65 or over.

Language and culture
As of 2000, speakers of English as their first language accounted for 59.92% of the population, while Spanish accounted for 22.63% of residents. It has a Jewish population; Hebrew and Yiddish speakers were respectively 3.66% and 2.78% of the population. Other languages spoken include Portuguese 2.65%, French 2.40%, Russian 1.75%, and German at 1.46% of city residents.

Transportation

Aventura’s partnership with Freebee offers free, on-demand, electric ride-sharing for anyone who wants to get around the city. The service runs from 7:00 AM to 11:00 PM everyday except Thanksgiving, Christmas, and New Years Day.

The Aventura Express shuttle bus is a city-run public bus service, free to anyone in Aventura. The service runs three routes (North, Central, and South). Miami-Dade Transit's Metrobus and Broward County Transit bus systems also run through the city. Metrobus provide connections to Metrorail and Metromover at Government Center via Biscayne Boulevard/US 1. Over the last 30 years, travel infrastructure in Aventura has been heavily funded and influenced by developers of the many highrise condominium projects near the beach. Efforts to mitigate traffic impacts associated with increased travel demand to and from these projects led to the majority of principal road, bridge and structure designed primarily to accommodate automobile travel. This, coupled with single-use zoning and a general lack of connectivity for pedestrians, cyclists and similar modes has contributed to heavy traffic congestion on and near Biscayne Boulevard (US 1), despite this highway having up to ten travel lanes at points. Moreover, costly road improvements have not effectively mitigated traffic increases. A grade separation at the intersection of Ives Dairy Road and Biscayne Boulevard was constructed to facilitate westbound travel leading to Interstate 95 and free flowing eastbound right turns, but traffic signal phasing of the remaining approaches was unchanged, and the intersection continued to experience regular long queues.

The main north-south road in the city is Biscayne Boulevard (US 1), and the main east-west route is the William H. Lehman Causeway.

Brightline is an inter-city rail service operating on the Florida East Coast Railway line between Miami and West Palm Beach, running parallel to Biscayne Boulevard. The Aventura station, located adjacent to the Aventura Mall, provides service along the route.

Tri-Rail commuter rail service has also been proposed to run on the FEC line. Another proposal would extend the Miami Metrorail along the US 1 corridor from Downtown Miami to the Broward County line, which would pass through Aventura and Hallandale Beach.

Area attractions

The most famous shopping attraction is Aventura Mall, a  indoor shopping center. The outdoor malls are "Aventura Town Center", "Aventura Shopping Center", "Aventura Commons", "The Promenade Shops", and "The Shoppes at the Waterways".

The city also has its own exclusive parks and recreation department which operate Founders Park, Founders Park Bayside, Waterways Park, Waterways Dog Park, Veterans Park, The Community Recreation Center, and the Aventura Arts and Cultural Center (AACC).

At the geographical center of Aventura is the Turnberry Golf Course, encircled by Aventura's Country Club Drive. The Turnberry Golf Course is a three-mile walking/jogging paved promenade which overlooks a multi million-dollar horticultural exhibit, lakes, opulent residential high rises, yachts and the Atlantic Ocean.

Education
Aventura is served by the Miami-Dade County Public Schools (MDCPS) system. Aventura Waterways K–8 Center serves as the public K–8 school of MDCPS which serves Aventura. The school is outside of the city limits but all children that live in Aventura are in the boundary for that school. Dr. Michael Krop High School in Ives Estates is currently the sole MDCPS high school serving North Miami-Dade County residents, including those of Aventura. Krop is considered to be a magnet school because it has a "Students Training in the Arts Repertory (STAR)" program, and has a total student body population of 2,833.

There are also charter schools established with sponsorship from the municipal government, Aventura City of Excellence School (ACES), a K–8 school. It was for years the only public school within the City of Aventura. It is operated by a private charter school company called Charter Schools USA. Built and opened in 2003, ACES was ranked in the top 10 of all schools in Florida in 2006. Construction on the Don Soffer Aventura High School, the other charter school, began in 2018. Opened in August 2019, the Charter School initially accepted ninth grade students in its first year and added grades 10 through 12 in subsequent years.

The Northeast Branch of the Miami-Dade Public Library System serves Aventura as a means of accessing information for all education alike.
 
Regional universities and higher education institutions include:
 Florida International University: Biscayne Bay Campus (North Miami)

Media
Aventura News is Aventura's own newspaper, which is published weekly and is part of the Miami Community Newspapers, The Voice of the Community. Aventura is served by the Miami–Ft. Lauderdale market for local radio and television. The city has a magazine named Aventura Magazine and is served by The Miami Herald and El Nuevo Herald.

In 2022, Aventura became the first city in Florida to offer the opportunity for the public to text its city government. The city monitors the text messages and responds to questions and concerns.

Notable people
Lucille Ball, actress best known for the television series I Love Lucy
James Caan, actor
Jimmy Connors, tennis player
Caroline, Princess of Hanover, Hereditary Princess of Monaco 
Billy Cunningham, basketball player and coach
Morton Downey Jr., singer, songwriter and television talk show host of The Morton Downey Jr. Show
Vitas Gerulaitis, Lithuanian-American professional tennis player
Whitney Houston, singer and actress
Jimmy Johnson, Dallas Cowboys two-time Super Bowl champion; Cowboys and later Miami Dolphins coach
Alan King, actor and comedian
Sophia Loren, Italian actress
Sid Luckman, NFL Hall of Fame football playerDing, Kevin (July 6, 1998) "Hall of Fame QB dies after heart attack". The Miami Herald. p. 2D.
John McEnroe, tennis player
Howard Metzenbaum, U.S. senator representing Ohio in 1974, and then again from 1977 to 1995
Carlo Ponti, Italian film producer
Carlo Ponti Jr., Italian orchestral conductor, son of Carlo Ponti
Edoardo Ponti, Italian director, son of Carlo Ponti
Sid Raymond, actor and comedian
Dennis Rodman, Basketball Hall of Fame, five-time NBA world champion, and two-time NBA All-Star
Jeffrey Rosen, billionaire businessman
Donald Soffer, real estate developerLubove, Seth (October 8, 1984) "Office-space gap above North Miami being filled". The Miami Herald. p. 5.
Fred Stolle, Australian tennis player, two-time major winner
Sandon Stolle, Australian tennis player 
Frankie Valli, pop singer
Alain Vigneault, head coach, NHL Philadelphia Flyers

References

External links
 

Cities in Miami-Dade County, Florida
Populated places on the Intracoastal Waterway in Florida
Cities in Florida
Former census-designated places in Florida
1995 establishments in Florida
Cities in Miami metropolitan area
Populated places established in 1995